Clarence Lamar (March 12, 1915 – July 15, 1951), nicknamed "Lemon", was an American Negro league shortstop who played in the 1930s and 1940s.

A native of Montgomery, Alabama, Lamar made his Negro leagues debut in 1937 with the St. Louis Stars and Birmingham Black Barons. He went on to play for several teams, finishing his career in 1944 with the Jacksonville Red Caps.

References

External links
 and Baseball-Reference Black Baseball stats and Seamheads

1915 births
1951 deaths
Birmingham Black Barons players
Cincinnati Clowns players
Cleveland Bears players
Jacksonville Red Caps players